František "Franta" Sauer (4 December 1882 – 26 March 1947) was a Czech writer and close friend of fellow writer Jaroslav Hašek.

Early life 
Franta Sauer was the seventh of eight children born to Barbora Sauerová (née Hájková) and Jan Sauer in Prague. Even though Sauer's parents were illiterate and poor, Sauer was an avid reader throughout his childhood. His father worked as a yardmaster on the railway and as a street hot dog vendor before he got injured and had to stop work.  His mother worked as a maid. After struggling in a traditional school, Sauer enrolled in a vocational school to become a locksmith. After completing his training, he returned to the District of Prague Žižkov, where he lived with his mother and sister.

Politics 

For a short period of time, Sauer was a member of the Social Democratic Party. and was eventually imprisoned for his right-wing views. News outlets frequently discussed stories about Sauer's life.

In November 1918, Sauer organized the demolition of the Marian Column of Prague in the Old Town Square. On 4 November 1923, he confessed to organizing the demolition in an article published in Rudé právo. During his trial, he claimed that although he was motivated by patriotism to remove the column, he had no intention of damaging it. As his actions were not barred, he was not sanctioned after his trial.

In 1918, Sauer organized the club Černá Ruka in the Žižkov, which helped move homeless people into classified apartments. Ivan Olbracht mentioned the club's actions in his novel Anna Proletářka.

At the end of World War II, Sauer was arrested for distributing publications by T. G. Masaryk and was relocated to Terezín. He was released in 1945 because he suffered from tuberculosis.

Friendship with Jaroslav Hašek 
In 1921–1922, Sauer co-published his first book, The Good Soldier Švejk, with Hašek. Sauer raised enough funds to publish the first edition and wrote the sequel with Hašek from the book's proceeds.

Death and legacy 
He appeared in front of a camera for the last time in 1947 in Čapek's Tales. After being given his last rites, he died in the Pod Petřínem hospital and was buried in the Olšany cemeteries. In 2016, the City of Prague adopted his grave. His spiritual evolution is mentioned in the poem Pražská legenda by Václav Renč.

Work 

Aside from his own name, Sauer published under the pseudonyms Fr. Habán, Franta Habán from the Žižkov, and Franta Kysela. Between 1911 and 1935, Sauer was published in journals such as České slovo, Právo lidu, Rudé právo, and Trn.

Books 
 Naše luza jezuité a diplomaté
 In memoriam Jaroslava Haška
 Pašeráci
 Emil Artur Longen a Xena
 Pašeráci
 Haškův poslední podnik
 Franta Habán ze Žižkova

Theater plays 
 Franta Habán ze Žižkova (1933)
 Haškův poslední podnik (1946)

Filmography 
 1947 Čapkovy povídky
 1931 Miláček pluku
 1931 Poslední bohém
 1931 Skalní ševci
 1931 Ze soboty na neděli

Inspiration 
 František Sauer is a character in the novel Anna Proletářka by Ivan Olbracht.

References 

Czech writers
1882 births
1947 deaths
Writers from Prague
People from the Kingdom of Bohemia
Male novelists
Czech male writers
20th-century novelists
20th-century male writers
20th-century deaths from tuberculosis
Tuberculosis deaths in the Czech Republic
Tuberculosis deaths in Czechoslovakia
Theresienstadt Ghetto survivors
Czech anarchists